Fire is the debut studio album by American rock band Electric Six. It was released through XL Recordings on May 20, 2003. It was preceded by the hit single "Danger! High Voltage", which peaked at number 2 on the UK Singles Chart. The album peaked at number 7 in the UK and received positive reviews from critics.

Reception

Critical
The album received generally positive reviews from critics. At review aggregator site Metacritic, the album has an average critic score of 70/100, based on 20 reviews. Rolling Stone called the album "the summer's most brilliantly demented party record" and Blender hailed the music as "convincingly ferocious".

Commercial
Fire peaked at number 7 on the UK Albums Chart. The three singles released from the album all also charted. "Danger! High Voltage", which reached #10 in the U.S. Billboard Hot Dance Music/Maxi-Singles Sales chart and #2 in the UK Singles Chart; "Gay Bar", which reached #5 in the UK Singles Chart; and "Dance Commander", which reached #40 in the UK Singles Chart. Fire went gold in the United Kingdom on September 5, 2003.

Track listing
All lyrics written by Tyler Spencer; all music composed by Tyler Spencer except where noted.
"Dance Commander" – 2:37
"Electric Demons in Love" – 3:06
"Naked Pictures (Of Your Mother)" – 2:11
"Danger! High Voltage" (Joe Frezza/Steve Nawara/Anthony Selph/Tyler Spencer) – 3:34
"She's White" – 3:16
"I Invented the Night" – 3:17
"Improper Dancing" – 3:14
"Gay Bar" – 2:20
"Nuclear War (On the Dance Floor)" – 1:16
"Getting Into the Jam" – 2:14
"Vengeance and Fashion" – 2:46
"I'm the Bomb" – 4:18
"Synthesizer" – 4:00

Japanese bonus tracks
"Don't Be Afraid of the Robot" – 1:40
"Remote Control (Me)" – 2:21
"I Lost Control of My Rock & Roll" – 1:47

Bonus DVD
 "Danger! High Voltage" music video
 "Gay Bar" music video
 "Dance Commander" music video

Personnel
 Dick Valentine - vocals
 The Rock-N-Roll Indian - lead guitar
 Surge Joebot - rhythm guitar
 Disco - bass
 M. - drums
 Jack White - background vocals (track 4), credited as "John S. O'Leary"
 Aran Ruth - musician
 Deeanne Iovan - musician
 Jim Diamond - musician
 The Sheik - musician
 Rachel Nagy - musician
 Matt Ajian - musician
 Kenny Tudrick - musician

Charts

Legacy
The band recorded a sequel to "Gay Bar" entitled "Gay Bar Part Two" on their album Flashy. It was less of a direct sequel and more of a satirisation of demand for them to write such a song.

The band performed the songs "Dance Commander", "Danger! High Voltage", "She's White", "Gay Bar" and "Synthesizer" on their live album Absolute Pleasure.

The songs "Dance Commander", "Danger! High Voltage", "Gay Bar" and "Synthesizer" were performed by the band in the live concert film Absolute Treasure.

The songs "I Invented the Night" and "I'm the Bomb" were performed on their second live album You're Welcome!.

A "stripped down", acoustic version of "Synthesizer" and "She's White" were performed as part of Electric Six's upcoming live album Chill Out!. "Synthesizer" was selected through a poll held for backers of the Kickstarter campaign used to fund the album.

References

Electric Six albums
2003 debut albums
XL Recordings albums